Evans Mensah (born 9 February 1998) is a Ghanaian footballer who plays as a winger for Ceramica.

Early life and youth
Born in Agona Swedru and raised in Ghana, Evans Mensah joined Right to Dream Academy after being scouted as a prodigious talent at an academy event.

Club career
Mensah was loaned to HJK in Finland after a successful medical analysis, making his Veikkausliiga debut for HJK in 3–2 loss to Inter Turku, coming on as substitute in the 90th minute, on 16 September 2016.

International career
Called up to the Ghana national football team as a replacement for David Accam, who was injured, Mensah made his international debut against Mozambique in a 2017 Africa Cup of Nations qualifier.

Career statistics

Club

References

External links

1998 births
Living people
People from Central Region (Ghana)
Association football wingers
Ghanaian footballers
Ghanaian expatriate footballers
Ghana international footballers
Right to Dream Academy players
International Allies F.C. players
Helsingin Jalkapalloklubi players
Klubi 04 players
Al-Duhail SC players
Portimonense S.C. players
Al Kharaitiyat SC players
Ceramica Cleopatra FC players
Ghana Premier League players
Veikkausliiga players
Kakkonen players
Qatar Stars League players
Egyptian Premier League players
Expatriate footballers in Finland
Expatriate footballers in Qatar
Expatriate footballers in Portugal
Expatriate footballers in Egypt
Ghanaian expatriate sportspeople in Finland
Ghanaian expatriate sportspeople in Qatar
Ghanaian expatriate sportspeople in Portugal
Ghanaian expatriate sportspeople in Egypt